The 2019–20 Washington Capitals season was the 46th season for the National Hockey League franchise that was established on June 11, 1974. The Capitals entered the season as the 4-time defending Metropolitan Division champions. They would go on to win the division for the fifth year in a row.

The season was suspended by the league officials on March 12, 2020, after several other professional and collegiate sports organizations followed suit as a result of the COVID-19 pandemic. On May 26, the NHL regular season was officially declared over with the remaining games being cancelled. The Capitals advanced to the playoffs, but were eliminated by the New York Islanders in the first round in five games.

Standings

Divisional standings

Eastern Conference

Schedule and results

Preseason
The preseason schedule was published on June 17, 2019.

|- style="background:#cfc;"
| 1 || September 16 || Chicago || 4–3 OT || 1–0–0
|- style="background:#cfc;"
| 2 || September 18 || St. Louis || 3–2 || 2–0–0
|- style="background:#cfc;"
| 3 || September 21 || Carolina || 3–2 || 3–0–0
|- style="background:#cfc;"
| 4 || September 25 || @ Chicago || 6–0 || 4–0–0
|- style="background:#fcc;"
| 5 || September 27 || @ St. Louis || 3–4 || 4–1–0
|- style="background:#cfc;"
| 6 || September 29 || @ Carolina || 4–3 || 5–1–0
|-

Regular season
The regular season schedule was published on June 25, 2019.

|- style="background:#cfc;"
| 1 || October 2 || @ St. Louis || 3–2 || OT || Holtby || Enterprise Center || 18,096 || 1–0–0 || 2 || 
|- style="background:#cfc;"
| 2 || October 4 || @ NY Islanders || 2–1 ||  || Samsonov || Nassau Coliseum || 13,917 || 2–0–0 || 4 || 
|- style="background:#fff;"
| 3 || October 5 || Carolina || 2–3 || OT || Holtby || Capital One Arena || 18,506 || 2–0–1 || 5 || 
|- style="background:#fff;"
| 4 || October 8 || Dallas || 3–4 || OT || Holtby || Capital One Arena || 18,573 || 2–0–2 || 6 || 
|- style="background:#fcc;"
| 5 || October 10 || @ Nashville || 5–6 ||  || Holtby || Bridgestone Arena || 17,386 || 2–1–2 || 6 || 
|- style="background:#cfc;"
| 6 || October 12 || @ Dallas || 4–1 ||  || Samsonov || American Airlines Center || 18,532 || 3–1–2 || 8 || 
|- style="background:#fcc;"
| 7 || October 14 || Colorado || 3–6 ||  || Samsonov || Capital One Arena || 18,573 || 3–2–2 || 8 || 
|- style="background:#cfc;"
| 8 || October 16 || Toronto || 4–3 ||  || Samsonov || Capital One Arena || 18,573 || 4–2–2 || 10 || 
|- style="background:#cfc;"
| 9 || October 18 || NY Rangers || 5–2 ||  || Holtby || Capital One Arena || 18,573 || 5–2–2 || 12 || 
|- style="background:#cfc;"
| 10 || October 20 || @ Chicago || 5–3 ||  || Holtby || United Center || 21,187 || 6–2–2 || 14 || 
|- style="background:#cfc;"
| 11 || October 22 || @ Calgary || 5–3 ||  || Holtby || Scotiabank Saddledome || 18,002 || 7–2–2 || 16 || 
|- style="background:#fff;"
| 12 || October 24 || @ Edmonton || 3–4 || OT || Holtby || Rogers Place || 17,144 || 7–2–3 || 17 || 
|- style="background:#cfc;"
| 13 || October 25 || @ Vancouver || 6–5 || SO || Samsonov || Rogers Arena || 18,871 || 8–2–3 || 19 || 
|- style="background:#cfc;"
| 14 || October 29 || @ Toronto || 4–3 || OT || Holtby || Scotiabank Arena || 19,258 || 9–2–3 || 21 || 
|-

|- style="background:#cfc;"
| 15 || November 1 || Buffalo || 6–1 ||  || Holtby || Capital One Arena || 18,573 || 10–2–3 || 23 || 
|- style="background:#cfc;"
| 16 || November 3 || Calgary || 4–2 ||  || Samsonov || Capital One Arena || 18,573 || 11–2–3 || 25 || 
|- style="background:#cfc;"
| 17 || November 7 || @ Florida || 5–4 || OT || Holtby || BB&T Center || 14,085 || 12–2–3 || 27 || 
|- style="background:#cfc;"
| 18 || November 9 || Vegas || 5–2 ||  || Holtby || Capital One Arena || 18,573 || 13–2–3 || 29 || 
|- style="background:#fff;"
| 19 || November 11 || Arizona || 3–4 || SO || Samsonov || Capital One Arena || 18,573 || 13–2–4 || 30 || 
|- style="background:#cfc;"
| 20 || November 13 || @ Philadelphia || 2–1 || SO || Holtby || Wells Fargo Center || 18,159 || 14–2–4 || 32 || 
|- style="background:#fcc;"
| 21 || November 15 || Montreal || 2–5 ||  || Samsonov || Capital One Arena || 18,573 || 14–3–4 || 32 || 
|- style="background:#cfc;"
| 22 || November 16 || @ Boston || 3–2 || SO || Holtby || TD Garden || 17,850 || 15–3–4 || 34 || 
|- style="background:#cfc;"
| 23 || November 18 || Anaheim || 5–2 ||  || Holtby || Capital One Arena || 18,573 || 16–3–4 || 36 || 
|- style="background:#fcc;"
| 24 || November 20 || @ NY Rangers || 1–4 ||  || Holtby || Madison Square Garden || 17,239 || 16–4–4 || 36 || 
|- style="background:#fff;"
| 25 || November 23 || Vancouver || 1–2 || SO || Holtby || Capital One Arena || 18,573 || 16–4–5 || 37 || 
|- style="background:#cfc;"
| 26 || November 27 || Florida || 4–3 ||  || Holtby || Capital One Arena || 18,573 || 17–4–5 || 39 || 
|- style="background:#cfc;"
| 27 || November 29 || Tampa Bay || 4–3 || OT || Holtby || Capital One Arena || 18,573 || 18–4–5 || 41 || 
|- style="background:#cfc;"
| 28 || November 30 || @ Detroit || 5–2 ||  || Samsonov || Little Caesars Arena || 19,190 || 19–4–5 || 43 || 
|-

|- style="background:#cfc;"
| 29 || December 3 || @ San Jose || 5–2 ||  || Holtby || SAP Center || 17,562 || 20–4–5 || 45 || 
|- style="background:#cfc;"
| 30 || December 4 || @ Los Angeles || 3–1 ||  || Samsonov || Staples Center || 16,102 || 21–4–5 || 47 || 
|- style="background:#cfc;"
| 31 || December 6 || @ Anaheim || 3–2 ||  || Holtby || Honda Center || 15,945 || 22–4–5 || 49 || 
|- style="background:#fcc;"
| 32 || December 9 || Columbus || 2–5 ||  || Holtby || Capital One Arena || 18,573 || 22–5–5 || 49 || 
|- style="background:#cfc;"
| 33 || December 11 || Boston || 3–2 ||  || Holtby || Capital One Arena || 18,573 || 23–5–5 || 51 || 
|- style="background:#cfc;"
| 34 || December 14 || @ Tampa Bay || 5–2 ||  || Samsonov || Amalie Arena || 19,092 || 24–5–5 || 53 || 
|- style="background:#fcc;"
| 35 || December 16 || @ Columbus || 0–3 ||  || Holtby || Nationwide Arena || 16,602 || 24–6–5 || 53 || 
|- style="background:#cfc;"
| 36 || December 20 || @ New Jersey || 6–3 ||  || Samsonov || Prudential Center || 15,021 || 25–6–5 || 55 || 
|- style="background:#cfc;"
| 37 || December 21 || Tampa Bay || 3–1 ||  || Holtby || Capital One Arena || 18,573 || 26–6–5 || 57 || 
|- style="background:#fcc;"
| 38 || December 23 || @ Boston || 3–7 ||  || Holtby || TD Garden || 17,850 || 26–7–5 || 57 || 
|- style="background:#cfc;"
| 39 || December 27 || Columbus || 2–1 || OT || Samsonov || Capital One Arena || 18,573 || 27–7–5 || 59 || 
|- style="background:#fcc;"
| 40 || December 28 || @ Carolina || 4–6 ||  || Holtby || PNC Arena || 18,680 || 27–8–5 || 59 || 
|- style="background:#fcc;"
| 41 || December 31 || NY Islanders || 3–4 ||  || Holtby || Capital One Arena || 18,573 || 27–9–5 || 59 || 
|-

|- style="background:#cfc;"
| 42 || January 3 || @ Carolina || 4–3 ||  || Samsonov || PNC Arena || 18,680 || 28–9–5 || 61 || 
|- style="background:#cfc;"
| 43 || January 5 || San Jose || 5–4 || OT || Holtby || Capital One Arena || 18,573 || 29–9–5 || 63 || 
|- style="background:#cfc;"
| 44 || January 7 || Ottawa || 6–1 ||  || Samsonov || Capital One Arena || 18,573 || 30–9–5 || 65 || 
|- style="background:#fcc;"
| 45 || January 8 || @ Philadelphia || 2–3 ||  || Holtby || Wells Fargo Center || 18,595 || 30–10–5 || 65 || 
|- style="background:#fcc;"
| 46 || January 11 || New Jersey || 1–5 ||  || Holtby || Capital One Arena || 18,573 || 30–11–5 || 65 || 
|- style="background:#cfc;"
| 47 || January 13 || Carolina || 2–0 ||  || Samsonov || Capital One Arena || 18,573 || 31–11–5 || 67 || 
|- style="background:#cfc;"
| 48 || January 16 || New Jersey || 5–2 ||  || Samsonov || Capital One Arena || 18,573 || 32–11–5 || 69 || 
|- style="background:#cfc;"
| 49 || January 18 || @ NY Islanders || 6–4 ||  || Samsonov || Nassau Coliseum || 13,917 || 33–11–5 || 71 || 
|- style="background:#cfc;"
| 50 || January 27 || @ Montreal || 4–2 ||  || Holtby || Bell Centre || 21,302 || 34–11–5 || 73 || 
|- style="background:#fcc;"
| 51 || January 29 || Nashville || 4–5 ||  || Holtby || Capital One Arena || 18,573 || 34–12–5 || 73 || 
|- style="background:#cfc;"
| 52 || January 31 || @ Ottawa || 5–3 ||  || Samsonov || Canadian Tire Centre || 14,279 || 35–12–5 || 75 || 
|-

|- style="background:#fcc;"
| 53 || February 2 || Pittsburgh || 3–4 ||  || Samsonov || Capital One Arena || 18,573 || 35–13–5 || 75 || 
|- style="background:#cfc;"
| 54 || February 4 || Los Angeles || 4–2 ||  || Holtby || Capital One Arena || 18,573 || 36–13–5 || 77 || 
|- style="background:#fcc;"
| 55 || February 8 || Philadelphia || 2–7 ||  || Holtby || Capital One Arena || 18,573 || 36–14–5 || 77 || 
|- style="background:#fcc;"
| 56 || February 10 || NY Islanders || 3–5 ||  || Samsonov || Capital One Arena || 18,573 || 36–15–5 || 77 || 
|- style="background:#cfc;"
| 57 || February 13 || @ Colorado || 3–2 ||  || Holtby || Pepsi Center || 18,146 || 37–15–5 || 79 || 
|- style="background:#fcc;"
| 58 || February 15 || @ Arizona || 1–3 ||  || Holtby || Gila River Arena || 17,139 || 37–16–5 || 79 || 
|- style="background:#fcc;"
| 59 || February 17 || @ Vegas || 2–3 ||  || Holtby || T-Mobile Arena || 18,399 || 37–17–5 || 79 || 
|- style="background:#fff;"
| 60 || February 20 || Montreal || 3–4 || OT || Holtby || Capital One Arena || 18,573 || 37–17–6 || 80 || 
|- style="background:#fcc;"
| 61 || February 22 || @ New Jersey || 2–3 ||  || Samsonov || Prudential Center || 16,514 || 37–18–6 || 80 || 
|- style="background:#cfc;"
| 62 || February 23 || Pittsburgh || 5–3 ||  || Holtby || Capital One Arena || 18,573 || 38–18–6 || 82 || 
|- style="background:#cfc;"
| 63 || February 25 || Winnipeg || 4–3 || SO || Holtby || Capital One Arena || 18,573 || 39–18–6 || 84 || 
|- style="background:#fcc;"
| 64 || February 27 || @ Winnipeg || 0–3 ||  || Samsonov || Bell MTS Place || 15,325 || 39–19–6 || 84 || 
|-

|- style="background:#cfc;"
| 65 || March 1 || @ Minnesota || 4–3 ||  || Holtby || Xcel Energy Center || 17,388 || 40–19–6 || 86 || 
|- style="background:#fcc;"
| 66 || March 4 || Philadelphia || 2–5 ||  || Holtby || Capital One Arena || 18,573 || 40–20–6 || 86 || 
|- style="background:#fff;"
| 67 || March 5 || @ NY Rangers || 5–6 || OT || Samsonov || Madison Square Garden || 17,277 || 40–20–7 || 87 || 
|- style="background:#cfc;"
| 68 || March 7 || @ Pittsburgh || 5–2 ||  || Holtby || PPG Paints Arena || 18,656 || 41–20–7 || 89 || 
|- style="background:#fff;"
| 69 || March 9 || @ Buffalo || 2–3 || SO || Holtby || KeyBank Center || 16,539 || 41–20–8 || 90 || 
|-

|- style="background:#;"
| 70 || March 12 || Detroit || Capital One Arena
|- style="background:#;"
| 71 || March 14 || Chicago || Capital One Arena
|- style="background:#;"
| 72 || March 16 || Edmonton || Capital One Arena
|- style="background:#;"
| 73 || March 19 || @ Columbus || Nationwide Arena
|- style="background:#;"
| 74 || March 20 || Ottawa || Capital One Arena
|- style="background:#;"
| 75 || March 22 || @ Pittsburgh || PPG Paints Arena
|- style="background:#;"
| 76 || March 24 || St. Louis || Capital One Arena
|- style="background:#;"
| 77 || March 26 || NY Rangers || Capital One Arena
|- style="background:#;"
| 78 || March 28 || @ Detroit || Little Caesars Arena
|- style="background:#;"
| 79 || March 30 || @ Buffalo || KeyBank Center
|- style="background:#;"
| 80 || March 31 || Toronto || Capital One Arena
|- style="background:#;"
| 81 || April 2 || Minnesota || Capital One Arena
|- style="background:#;"
| 82 || April 4  || @ Florida || BB&T Center
|-

|-
|

Playoffs

The Capitals played in a round-robin tournament to determine their seed for the playoffs. Washington finished with a 1–1–1 record to clinch the third seed for the playoffs.

The Capitals were defeated by the New York Islanders in the first round in five games.

|- style="background:#fff;"
| 1 || August 3 || @ Tampa Bay || 2–3 || SO || Holtby || Scotiabank Arena || 0–0–1 || 1 || 
|- style="background:#fcc;"
| 2 || August 6 || @ Philadelphia || 1–3 ||  || Holtby || Scotiabank Arena || 0–1–1 || 1 || 
|- style="background:#cfc;"
| 3 || August 9 || Boston || 2–1 ||  || Holtby || Scotiabank Arena || 1–1–1 || 3 || 
|-

|- style="background:#fcc;
| 1 || August 12 || NY Islanders || 2–4 ||  || Holtby || Scotiabank Arena || 0–1 || 
|- style="background:#fcc;
| 2 || August 14 || NY Islanders || 2–5 ||  || Holtby || Scotiabank Arena || 0–2 || 
|- style="background:#fcc;
| 3 || August 16 || @ NY Islanders || 1–2 || OT || Holtby || Scotiabank Arena || 0–3 || 
|- style="background:#cfc;
| 4 || August 18 || @ NY Islanders || 3–2 ||  || Holtby || Scotiabank Arena || 1–3 || 
|- style="background:#fcc;
| 5 || August 20 || NY Islanders || 0–4 ||  || Holtby || Scotiabank Arena || 1–4 || 
|-

|-
|

Player statistics

Skaters

Goaltenders

†Denotes player spent time with another team before joining the Capitals. Stats reflect time with the Capitals only.
‡Denotes player was traded mid-season. Stats reflect time with the Capitals only.
Bold/italics denotes franchise record.

Transactions
The Capitals have been involved in the following transactions during the 2019–20 season.

Trades

Free agents

Waivers

Contract terminations

Retirement

Signings

Draft picks

Below are the Washington Capitals' selections at the 2019 NHL Entry Draft, which was held on June 21 and 22, 2019, at Rogers Arena in Vancouver, British Columbia.

Notes:
 The San Jose Sharks' third-round pick went to the Washington Capitals as the result of a trade on June 22, 2019, that sent a fourth-round pick and Buffalo's fifth-round pick both in 2019 (118th and 129th overall) to New Jersey in exchange for this pick.
 The San Jose Sharks' fifth-round pick went to the Washington Capitals as the result of a trade on June 22, 2019, that sent a seventh-round pick in 2019 (211th overall) and 2020 to San Jose in exchange for this pick.

References

Washington Capitals seasons
Washington Capitals
Washington Capitals
Washington Capitals